is an Echizen Railway Mikuni Awara Line railway station located in the city of Fukui, Fukui Prefecture, Japan.  The station's name was chosen by employees of Nicca Chemical, which obtained 10-year naming rights to the station for six million yen.

Lines

Station layout
The station consists of one side platformserving a single bi-directional track. The station is unattended. There is a small variable message sign on the platform that warns passengers about incoming trains.  It flashes "電車がきます”, or, "the train is coming" to the tune of Mary Had a Little Lamb.

Adjacent stations

History
Nikkakagaku-Mae Station was opened on September 1, 2007.

Surrounding area
The area is mostly residential. The headquarters and main research facilities of Nicca Chemical are located just to the west of the station.
Other points of interest include:
University of Fukui (North Gate)
Fukui Bunkyō Post Office
 (Fujishima-dōri)
Fukui - Ishikawa Prefectural Route 5 (Awara Kaidō)

See also
 List of railway stations in Japan

References

External links

  

Railway stations in Fukui Prefecture
Railway stations in Japan opened in 2007
Mikuni Awara Line
Fukui (city)